Elections to Colchester Borough Council took place in 1982 alongside other local elections across the United Kingdom.

This was the first Colchester local election to be contested by the newly formed SDP-Liberal Alliance.

Summary

Ward results

Berechurch

Birch-Messing

Boxted & Langham

Castle

Harbour

Lexden

Mile End

New Town

Prettygate

Shrub End

St. Andrew's

St. Anne's

St. John's

St. Mary's

Stanway

Tiptree

West Bergholt

West Mersea

Winstree

Wivenhoe

References

1982
1982 English local elections
1980s in Essex